Arrester may refer to:

Lightning arrester
Arrestor bed (disambiguation)
Surge arrester